Arjan van Heusden (born 11 December 1972) is a Dutch former professional football goalkeeper who played much of his career in the English Football League.

Career
Van Heusden began his career in his native Netherlands with VV Noordwijk, moving to England in December 1993 for a trial with Port Vale, signing permanently in May 1994 for a fee of £4,500. He joined up with fellow Dutchman Robin van der Laan, who had already established himself in John Rudge's squad. However Van Heusden failed to dislodge the ever-reliable Paul Musselwhite and so joined Oxford United on loan in September 1997, playing 11 league games.

In August 1998, he moved to Cambridge United on a free transfer. He played 42 league games in two seasons before moving to Exeter City in August 2000. He missed just five league games of the 2000–01 campaign. After stalling on Exeter's offer of a fresh contract in April 2002 he signed within the club's ten-day limit, though this failed to put an end to speculation over his future.

In August 2002 he joined Scottish side Clyde on a short-term deal, before returning to England to play for Mansfield Town the following month as Mansfield were in the midst of a goalkeeping injury crisis. In November 2002 he joined Torquay United, initially on non-contract terms, later signing a longer contract after establishing himself as the first choice keeper. He struggled with injury in the 2004–05 season and subsequently retired from professional football and returned to the Netherlands where he resumed his playing career with FC Lisse.

Career statistics
Source:

References

1972 births
Living people
Footballers from Alphen aan den Rijn
Association football goalkeepers
Dutch footballers
Dutch expatriate footballers
Expatriate footballers in England
Port Vale F.C. players
Oxford United F.C. players
Cambridge United F.C. players
Exeter City F.C. players
Expatriate footballers in Scotland
Clyde F.C. players
Mansfield Town F.C. players
Torquay United F.C. players
FC Lisse players
English Football League players